The Institute of Lens Arts Australia was an independent film school founded in 1994 by John Wynn-Tweg and located in Kalorama, Victoria, Australia.

Courses 
 Diploma of Screen Arts - Film Practice
 Advanced Diploma in Cinematography
 Advanced Film Directing

References

External links 
 2Finder.com Business Listing
 Bio of with former student Julian Roberts
 Bio of former student Dean Francis
 ASIC Registration

Film schools in Australia
Defunct schools in Victoria (Australia)